Roelof Andries Smit (born 11 January 1993 in Queenstown, Eastern Cape) is a South African rugby union player for the Lions in Super Rugby, the Golden Lions in the Currie Cup and the Lions in the Rugby Challenge. He also represented South Africa against the Barbarians in 2016. His regular position is flanker.

Career

Youth
In 2012, he was a member of the Blue Bulls teams that finished runners-up in the 2012 Under-19 Provincial Championship, making ten starts and scoring three tries.

Blue Bulls
A further two appearances followed that season.

In 2013, he signed a contract extension to keep him at the  until 2015. He signed a further extension in 2015 to remain in Pretoria until the end of the 2017 season.

Representative rugby
He was included in the South Africa Under-20 squad for the 2013 IRB Junior World Championship.

References

South African rugby union players
Living people
1993 births
Blue Bulls players
Bulls (rugby union) players
Rugby union flankers
People from Queenstown, South Africa
South Africa Under-20 international rugby union players
Lions (United Rugby Championship) players
Golden Lions players
Western Province (rugby union) players
Rugby union players from the Eastern Cape
Cheetahs (rugby union) players
Free State Cheetahs players